Eugen Rupf (16 June 1914 – 2000) was a Swiss footballer who played for Switzerland in the 1938 FIFA World Cup.

He played for Grasshopper Club Zürich. He also played three seasons for Basel as player-coach scoring 20 goals in 41 appearances. With Rupf as trainer, Basel were promoted in the season 1941–42 and reached Swiss Cup final that season.

Rupf died in 2000.

References

1914 births
2000 deaths
Swiss men's footballers
Switzerland international footballers
1938 FIFA World Cup players
Association football forwards
Grasshopper Club Zürich players
FC Basel managers
FC Basel players
Swiss football managers